Yihong Qi is an engineer, professor, entrepreneur, and inventor. His work focuses on networking science and technology. Qi is currently an adjunct professor of Electrical and Computer Engineering at the Missouri University of Science and Technology. He is a Fellow of The Canadian Academy of Engineering  and of the National Academy of Inventors. Qi's research has led to the founding of five independent companies.

Education
Qi received his Master of Engineering (Space Electronics) at the Chinese Academy of Space Technology in 1985 and earned a Doctor of Philosophy degree (Microwave Engineering) at Xidian University in 1989.

Career
Qi worked for Research In Motion Ltd. (now BlackBerry) from 1995 to 2010, where in his role as the Director of Advanced Electromagnetic Research he was in charge of system integrations, antenna development, and radio frequency (RF) and electromagnetic compatibility (EMC) measurement.

In 2011, Qi founded DBJ Technologies, a communications software and hardware company, primarily known for the research and development of mobile communication platform software and hardware. In 2012, he co-founded AccuGPS, a global software technology company known for its fleet management system. In 2013, he founded ENICE, a wireless telecommunications technology enterprise that supplies and integrates peripheral equipment in wireless communications. In 2014, he co-founded General Test Systems, a wireless telecommunications company, known to primarily provide Over-the-Air (OTA) testing of mobile terminal antennas.

In 2017, Qi co-founded Mercku, a wireless sensing and connectivity company, where they provide Wi-Fi and wireless sensing solutions for businesses and subscribers.

Awards and honours
 2014 - Distinguished Lecturer, IEEE EMC Society
 2015 - Distinguished Lecturer, IEEE EMC Society
 2017 - Technical Achievement Award, IEEE EMC Society
 2018 - Fellow, Canadian Academy of Engineering
 2019 - Fellow, National Academy of Inventors

References 

Year of birth missing (living people)
Living people
Missouri University of Science and Technology faculty
Fellows of the Canadian Academy of Engineering
Fellows of the National Academy of Inventors
Xidian University alumni